Orange Blossom (French: La fleur d'oranger) is a 1932 French comedy film directed by Henry Roussel and starring André Lefaur, André Alerme and José Noguéro. A son doesn't tell his domineering father that he has recently got married.

The film's sets were designed by Guy de Gastyne.

Cast
 André Lefaur as Le juge Le Hochet de Méricourt  
 André Alerme as Birbat  
 José Noguéro as Alfredo Ramos  
 Marcel Lutrand as Darblay  
 René Lefèvre as Raymond de Méricourt  
  as Madeleine  
 Hélène Robert as Renée  
 Blanche Denège as Mme de Méricourt  
 Marfa d'Hervilly as Mme de Saint-Fugasse 
 Daisy Thomas as La femme de chambre
 Jacques Beauvais 
 Pierre Berlioz 
 Clairjane 
 Irma Perrot

References

Bibliography 
 Crisp, Colin. Genre, Myth and Convention in the French Cinema, 1929-1939. Indiana University Press, 2002.

External links 
 

1932 films
1932 comedy films
French comedy films
1930s French-language films
Films directed by Henry Roussel
Pathé films
French black-and-white films
1930s French films